A list of films produced in Argentina in 1958:

1958 film images

External links and references
 Argentine films of 1958 at the Internet Movie Database

1958
Argentine
Films